Dineutus loriae is a species of beetle within the family of whirligig beetles, or Gyrinidae. The species name loriae honors the Italian explorer Lamberto Loria (1855–1913). This beetle can reach a length of about 20 mm.

References

Bibliography
 Polhemus, D.A. 2011.  New distributional records for Gyrinidae (Insecta: Coleoptera) on New Guinea and nearby islands, with a checklist of the New Guinea species. Zootaxa 2900: 51-68. 
 Dan A. Polhemus, Ronald A. Englund, Gerald R. Allen  Freshwater Biotas of New Guinea and Nearby Islands

Gyrinidae
Beetles described in 1899